The 2019 World Figure Skating Championships were held in Saitama, Japan, from March 18–24, 2019.

Records 

The following new ISU best scores were set during this competition:

Qualification

Age and minimum TES requirements
Skaters are eligible for the 2019 World Championships if they turned 15 years of age before July 1, 2018, and have met the minimum technical elements score requirements. The ISU accepts scores if they were obtained at senior-level ISU-recognized international competitions at least 21 days before the first official practice day of the championships.

Due to the difference in the rules for the 2017–18 and 2018–19 seasons, the required minimum scores have been adjusted separately for scores reached in the 2017–18 and the 2018–19 season.

Number of entries per discipline 
Based on the results of the 2018 World Championships, each ISU member nation can field one to three entries per discipline.

Entries 
Member nations began announcing their selections in January 2019. The International Skating Union published the full list of entries on February 25, 2019.

Changes to preliminary assignments

Recap

Men

Short program
Nathan Chen finished first after the short program, with his American teammate Jason Brown finishing in second place. Chen was satisfied with his performance, saying, "There are always things I can do better, things I can improve on but ultimately everything I did, I did as best as I could and I hope to continue that into the free program". Brown's short program, despite not having any quad jumps in comparison to his competitors, has been praised as one of the best short programs of the season. After moving to Toronto in the off-season, Brown reflected on his newfound maturity, noting, "There's a bit of confidence, a maturity confidence. As far as the skating goes, there's still a lot of changes that we have to make, but as the season's gone on, I've gotten a lot more confidence. I think it's a sense of maturity, the way that I'm carrying myself." Two-time Olympic and World Champion Yuzuru Hanyu, rounded out the top 3 despite doubling his quad salchow attempt. While commenting about his performance at the press conference Hanyu expressed his surprise of being awarded third place, despite missing the second half of the season due to an injured ankle, "I'm disappointed with my short program, I made a big mistake and I've got to reform and improve for the free skate, but I'm honoured to be in the top three." Four Continents Bronze Medallist Vincent Zhou finished in fourth, European bronze medallist Matteo Rizzo was fifth, while Four Continents champion, Olympic silver medallist and two-time defending silver medallist Shoma Uno completed the top six.

Free skate
Chen maintained the lead he gained in the short program, becoming the first American male skater to defend a World Title since Scott Hamilton in 1984. He finished 22 points ahead of Hanyu, who became the first skater to break the 200-point mark since the introduction of the +5 GOE system, marking the fifth consecutive year of a Japanese skater winning the silver medal. Hanyu was called for an under-rotation and uneasy landing on his quad salchow, missed half of the season due to a lingering ankle injury and was proud of his performance despite not having enough strength in his ankle. Zhou's bronze medal was his first major ISU Championship senior medal, making himself and Chen the first two American men to make the world championship podium since 1996. After breaking the free skate world record at Four Continents, Uno's fourth-place finish was a shock to the home crowd—with a fall on his quad flip, an under-rotation on a combination jump and incomplete landing call on his opening quad salchow—was notably in tears when speaking to Japanese media stating feelings of regret and disappointment. When reflecting on his season, Uno was upset at his performance "If I recall, there are more competitions that I got disappointed over joyful ones in this season, [...] Overall, I am still disappointed in myself. I need to become much stronger mentally." Jin Boyang finished in fifth with two triple Axels and a big cheer from the crowd, with his performance component score bringing down his marks. Despite a second-place finish in the short program, Brown could not maintain his lead and dropped to ninth overall after a messy free skate, including a fall on his quad salchow, although was positive about his incredible improvement throughout the season. Kevin Aymoz suffered an injury to his hands after cutting them when trying to save a jump gone wrong, resulting in blood dripping on the ice.

Ladies

Short program
2018 Olympic gold medallist Alina Zagitova took the lead in the short program, ahead of home crowd favourite and Japanese national champion Kaori Sakamoto who achieved a personal best score after performing a near perfect triple flip-triple toe-loop combination. Zagitova mentioned that she was nervous before beginning her program as she had experienced several mistakes and errors throughout the season, although stated that she felt more mentally prepared in comparison to the rest of her season. Sakamoto was pleased with her performance, "I was able to execute everything as I did in practice and will aim to do that again in the free skate." Zagitova's training partner Elizabet Tursynbaeva surprised both critics and the crowd to finish in third. After a rocky season, two-time world champion Evgenia Medvedeva finished fourth by achieving a seasons best for a short program that was first performed in December, receiving a standing ovation from the Japanese crowd despite an under-rotation call on her triple toe-loop. Short program world record holder and Grand Prix Final champion, Rika Kihira finished in seventh after singling her triple Axel attempt. 2017 World bronze medallist and 2018 Olympic Team Champion Gabrielle Daleman made her return to international competition after taking personal leave for mental health reasons, finishing in 11th despite skating clean.

Free skate
Zagitova took first in the free skate to win her first world title, becoming the first female skater since Yuna Kim to complete a Career Grand Slam after silver medal finishes at the Grand Prix Final and Europeans. When speaking to the media Zagitova stated "I realized that I needed a clean skate and I went into each jump determined to land it". Tursynbaeva became the first senior woman to land a quad jump, completing a clean quad salchow in the free skate to take silver for Kazakhstan, their first in any discipline since Denis Ten in 2015. Tursynbaeva couldn't believe she landed her quad after falling in her previous two attempts in competition. Medvedeva narrowly beat Kihira for the bronze by a tenth of a mark, despite Kihira beating Medvedeva in the free skate the deficit from the short program it was not enough to change the standings. Kihira's Japanese teammates, short program silver medallist Sakamoto and Satoko Miyahara finished fifth and sixth, respectively, with Sakamoto popping her planned triple-flip which cost her a place on the podium. The judging panel came under scrutiny with Medvedeva not being called for her lutz performed with the wrong edge, with critics and fans criticising a lack of consistency amongst the judging of other skaters, marring the final result.

Pairs

Short program
Evgenia Tarasova & Vladimir Morozov finished the short program by breaking the world record, competing with their 2018 Olympic short program. In their second competition of the season, 2017 World Champions Sui Wenjing & Han Cong finished in second place, with their training partners and compatriots Peng Cheng & Jin Yang finishing in third. Event favourites Vanessa James & Morgan Cipres struggled with the short program once again, after James accidentally collided with Matteo Guarise in the warm-up that left both athletes shaken. Guarise was left with bruises on his left hip and pain in his left knee, "I wanted to slow down when I saw Vanessa, I am a big guy and she is so tiny. I didn't want to hurt her." James, who was left uninjured, when discussing the incident with Olympic Channel she noted, "we've had some hard situations but we always push through them."

Free skate
Sui and Han broke the free skate world record to win their second world title in three years, with the skates by the top four considered to be one of the best in recent world championships, with Sui and Han's considered one of the best pairs free skates of all time. Sui discussed the difficulties and challenges they had throughout the season while recovering from ankle surgery, Sui noted to the media "In the short, we performed very well, and as the last to go on today, we knew that if we did well and challenged ourselves, we would win." Although Morozov stumbled his side-by-side jump, he and his partner Tarasova finished in second place, with their compatriots Natalia Zabiiako and Alexander Enbert taking a surprising bronze medal after finishing in fourth in the short program. Despite finishing third in the free skate and fifth overall, James and Cipres were frustrated with their performances, with Cipres adding although they were proud of their performance, "we want this title, everybody knows that we can do it, we know that we can do it, and we are going to do it."

Ice dance

Rhythm dance
Defending world champions Gabriella Papadakis & Guillaume Cizeron completed the Rhythm Dance with a five-point lead over the Russian team of Victoria Sinitsina & Nikita Katsalapov. Papadakis stated that an improvement of their technique training helped them gain the points advantage they wanted going into the free skate, calling their skate "the best performance". Olympic Ice Dance Champion Meryl Davis, praised Papadakis and Cizeron for their performance, calling it "very special, [...] remarkable" and "in a class of their own". Alexandra Stepanova & Ivan Bukin finished in third, leading by 0.01 over Americans and defending silver medallists Madison Hubbell & Zachary Donohue. Hubbell was positive about their performance as they had improved their technical score, which was their main goal for their performance. The reigning bronze medallists, Kaitlyn Weaver & Andrew Poje finished in fifth, with Weaver calling their performance "a magical experience [...] but not perfect". Laurence Fournier Beaudry & Nikolaj Sorensen made their first appearance for Canada after competing for Denmark in previous championships, with Sorensen suffering a wardrobe malfunction that placed them in tenth.

Free dance
Papadakis and Cizeron maintained their lead from the Rhythm Dance winning their fourth World Title in five years by finishing eleven points higher overall than silver medallists Sinitsina and Katsalapov, with the French team's only loss being to Tessa Virtue & Scott Moir in 2017. Cizeron was happy with their performance, while Papadakis reflected at the last time the world championships were in Saitama, "we were exactly here five years ago for the worlds in Saitama and it's funny to remember the whole experience we came in this five years, where we were at the time and where we are now". Katsalapov achieved his first major ISU Championship medal since his bronze medal at the Sochi Olympics with previous partner Elena Ilinykh, while it was current partner Sinitsina first overall. Sinitsina and Katsalapov were also the first Russian Ice Dance team to finish on the worlds podium since Ekaterina Bobrova & Dmitri Soloviev in 2013. Hubbell and Donohue took the bronze ahead of Stepanova and Bukin, making it the fifth consecutive year of an American Ice Dance team finishing on the podium. Hubbell explained how their partnership had improved throughout the year and the risk to change their program choreography weeks before the world championship, "to be able to skate an emotionally strong performance as well as a technically strong performance, it's what every athlete wants." Despite receiving a standing ovation from the crowd, Stepanova and Bukin's technical content was not enough to push them into the top three, missing by two points. Weaver and Poje completed the top five, despite missing the first half of the season, performing a tribute program to late skater Denis Ten.

Results

Men

Ladies

Pairs

Ice dance

Medals summary

Medalists
Medals awarded to the skaters who achieve the highest overall placements in each discipline:

Small medals awarded to the skaters who achieve the highest short program or rhythm dance placements in each discipline:

Medals awarded to the skaters who achieve the highest free skating or free dance placements in each discipline:

Medals by country
Table of medals for overall placement:

Table of small medals for placement in the short segment:

Table of small medals for placement in the free segment:

Controversy

Mariah Bell/Lim Eun-soo collision
During a practice session run-through of American skater Mariah Bell's short program, Bell skated past Korean skater Lim Eun-soo, who was along the baseboards. As Bell approached, her toe-pick scraped the back of Lim's left calf, causing a minor injury. Bell had right-of-way on the ice at the time due to it being her program run-through. Lim's management agency, All That Skate, claimed that the incident was a deliberate attack by Bell on her training teammate in Rafael Arutyunyan's coaching group, while Bell said it was an accident.  Because Bell's music was playing during practice, she had the right-of-way at the time and Lim should have been aware of where Bell was on the ice. ISU released a statement clearing Bell of wrongdoing in the incident. U.S. Figure Skating extended an apology to the Korean Skating Union over the incident.

References

External links 
 2019 World Championships at the International Skating Union

World Figure Skating Championships, 2019
World Figure Skating Championships
International figure skating competitions hosted by Japan
World Figure Skating Championships
World Figure Skating Championships
Sport in Saitama (city)
Figure skating in Japan